The Silent Worker was a newspaper published in the United States serving the deaf community.  Originally published in 1888 as the Deaf Mute Times, the paper was renamed that year to The Silent Worker.  The paper was published monthly from fall through spring by the New Jersey School for the Deaf  The Worker published articles, primarily written by deaf authors, highlighting the abilities and achievements of the deaf community in industry.

During the early 20th century, when most school administrations were transitioning away from the use of American Sign Language in favor of the oral method of instruction, the worker generally advocated a dissenting view.  Publication ceased in June 1929 following the dismissal of its editor, George Porter.

A new edition of the Silent Worker was published by the National Association for the Deaf beginning in 1948.

See also
Silent News
Elizabeth English Benson, featured 1906

Reference List

External links
Gallaudet University digital collection of The Silent Worker 

Defunct newspapers published in New Jersey